Club Deportivo Izarra is a Spanish football team, based in Estella-Lizarra, in the autonomous community of Navarre. Founded in 1924 it plays in Segunda División RFEF – Group 2, holding home matches at Estadio Merkatondoa, with a capacity of 3,500 seats.

History
In the 1920s several clubs appeared in the town of Estella; The Sport Club Estellés, C.D. Iberia, Unión Deportiva Estellesa and C.D. La Estrella which they faced together with soldiers of the Military Orders disputing local tournaments.Finally, the C.D Izarra appears. The club is founded on January 6, 1924 and joins the other teams in the tournament dispute.
In 1943 its first ascent to Tercera Division takes place. After several decades playing between national and regional division. From the season 1983/84 consolidates in Third Division, it obtains a subchampionship in 1984/85 and in 1989/90 is champion of the group and manages to ascend to Segunda Division B. It managed to stay in Segunda Division B for 8 seasons during the 1990s. It descends again to Third Division in 1999/2000.
After irregular seasons, he gets twice to become champion of group 15 of Third Division.
From season 2009/10 returns to play in Segunda Division B. That season was not successful as the club finished 18th and returned to Tercera.Another step for Segunda Division B, in 2012 and as of 2015, the team sits again in the bronze category of Spanish football for six consecutive seasons.

Season to season

16 seasons in Segunda División B
2 seasons in Segunda División RFEF
36 seasons in Tercera División

Honours
Tercera División: 1989–90, 2007–08, 2008–09, 2013–14
Regional Championships: 1956–57, 1959–60, 1967–68, 1982–83, 2005–06

Current squad

Notable players
Note: this list includes players that have played at least 100 league games and/or have reached international status.

References

External links
Official website 
Futbolme team profile 
BDFutbol team profile
Futnavarra team profile 

 
Football clubs in Navarre
Association football clubs established in 1924
1924 establishments in Spain